Tommy Houston (born January 29, 1945) is a retired NASCAR Busch Series driver. Over his career, Houston and Jack Ingram became known as the pair of journeymen drivers that helped that series grow throughout the 1980s and early 1990s.

Houston was born in Hickory, North Carolina, and was in the NASCAR Late Model Sportsman division, winning nearly 150 races before the series was formed into the Busch Series.

Busch Series career 
Houston made the inaugural race of the Busch Series at the 1982 Daytona race. Driving the No. 27 Kings Inn Chevy for Mike Day, Houston started 23rd and finished the race in ninth position. The next week, Houston started 15th at the series' first ever short track race, at Richmond Fairgrounds Raceway. From there, Houston moved solidly through the field and held off Bubba Nissen for the win. After problems at Bristol, Houston put together a run of five top-10 finishes. However, inconsistency through the year cost him. He did not finish the last three races as well as seven others. That cost him any shot at the title. At Hickory Speedway in August, however, Houston held off Tommy Ellis for his second career win, after starting fourth. All told, he finished fourth in the 1982 Busch Series points.

In 1983, Houston began running his No. 6 full-time. He was able to reduce his DNF count from 10 to 6. He had four more top-10 finishes. He won two races at Orange County Speedway, and one each at Indianapolis Raceway Park and Hickory. He also finished second three times. His sponsors over the years included Southern Biscuit Flour, Roses Stores, and, later, Red Devil Paints.

Houston snapped a 50 race winless streak at his home track on Easter Sunday in 1992 after the death of his father the day before. Houston came from three laps down to overtake Bobby Labonte for the win. The USA Today headline read "Divine Intervention".

His family was very involved in his efforts. He was inducted into the National Motorsports Press Association Hall of Fame in 2008.

Personal life 
Houston's son, Andy Houston, raced in all of the three major NASCAR series. Additionally, he is the uncle of Teresa Earnhardt, wife of Dale Earnhardt.

Motorsports career results

NASCAR
(key) (Bold – Pole position awarded by qualifying time. Italics – Pole position earned by points standings or practice time. * – Most laps led.)

Winston Cup Series

Busch Series

Craftsman Truck Series

Busch North Series

ARCA Talladega SuperCar Series
(key) (Bold – Pole position awarded by qualifying time. Italics – Pole position earned by points standings or practice time. * – Most laps led.)

References

External links
 
 

1945 births
Living people
NASCAR drivers
People from Hickory, North Carolina
Racing drivers from North Carolina